Chad D'Orsey Jones (born October 5, 1988) is an American former baseball and American football player. He was drafted by the New York Giants in the third round of the 2010 NFL Draft, and the Cincinnati Reds in the ninth round of the 2013 MLB draft. He played college football and college baseball at Louisiana State University.

Early years
Jones attended St. Augustine High School in New Orleans before evacuating to Southern Laboratory High School in Baton Rouge, Louisiana following Hurricane Katrina. He was considered one of the best safeties in the nation and was the number one rated safety by Rivals.com and Scout.com. As a senior, he had 138 tackles and 12 interceptions as a safety and 464 yards and 12 touchdowns as a running back.

Baseball career
Jones was drafted by the Houston Astros in the 13th round of the 2007 Major League Baseball draft but decided to attend LSU. In 2009, he was a member of the Tigers 2009 national championship team. He pitched three innings during the series and did not allow a hit or run. Jones and his college teammate Jared Mitchell are the only two college athletes ever to claim a BCS national title and a baseball national title. During the regular season he had a 2.70 earned run average and struck out seven in 6.2 innings and also started eight of 27 games in the outfield. He was selected by the Milwaukee Brewers in the 50th round (1509th overall) of the 2010 MLB draft. He was also selected by the Cincinnati Reds in the 9th round (285 overall) of the 2013 MLB draft.

Football career

College
As a true freshman in 2007 Jones played in all 14 of the Tigers games at cornerback and was a member of their National Championship team. He finished with 34 tackles, two sacks, and an interception. As a sophomore in 2008 Jones started six of 13 games, recording 50 tackles and an interception

Professional

New York Giants
Jones was selected by the New York Giants in the third round (76th overall) of the 2010 NFL Draft.

Jones was waived by the Giants on May 14, 2012 after failing a physical.

Cincinnati Reds

After deciding to pursue baseball, Jones was drafted by the Cincinnati Reds in the 9th round of the 2013 MLB draft.

Personal
Jones's older brother, Rahim Alem, is a former defensive end for the Cincinnati Bengals.

Jones was involved in a single-car crash in New Orleans during the early morning hours of June 25, 2010. He lost control of his Range Rover while trying to get off streetcar tracks and hit a pole. Two of the passengers in his car suffered minor injuries. Jones's most serious injuries were to his left ankle and leg, which include a broken tibia and fibula.

References

External links
New York Giants bio
LSU Tigers football bio
LSU Tigers baseball bio

1988 births
Living people
American football safeties
LSU Tigers football players
LSU Tigers baseball players
New York Giants players
Players of American football from Baton Rouge, Louisiana
Players of American football from New Orleans
Sportspeople from Baton Rouge, Louisiana
Baseball players from New Orleans
Baseball pitchers
Arizona League Reds players
Billings Mustangs players